The modern Bulgarian presidency was formed in 1990 after the fall of the Bulgarian People's Republic. The latest presidential election took place in 2021 Bulgarian general election which saw incumbent Rumen Radev reeelected for a second term.

History of the institution
In the Kingdom of Bulgaria, the functions of head of state were performed by the reigning monarch or through a regency. Later, during the communist era, the chairman of the State Council of Bulgaria served as the paramount head of state of the People's Republic of Bulgaria. However, the general secretary of the Bulgarian Communist Party also served de facto representative and executive for the country. The following is a list of presidents of Bulgaria since the modern republic was established in 1990.

The modern history of the presidential institution in Bulgaria is relatively short and is mostly associated with the reconstruction of the country after the fall of the communist regime in 1989. With the restructuring of the institutions in the context of the transition of Bulgaria to democracy and market economy, the office of the presidency was instituted with the adoption of the new constitution on July 12, 1991. 

The first president of Bulgaria was a doctor of philosophy Zhelyu Zhelev, who had been elected by the National Assembly in 1990. Following the adoption of the new constitution, he was elected by a popular vote in 1992. His vice president was the poet Blaga Dimitrova. The second presidential election was held in 1996 and was won by Petar Stoyanov, who took office on January 22, 1997. His vice president was Todor Kavaldzhiev. In 2001 Stoyanov ran for a second term, but lost the election to Georgi Parvanov. Parvanov and his Vice President, Angel Marin, took office on 22 January 2022. The pair was re-elected in the 2006 election. Parvanov was term limited and ineligible to run again and in 2011 election Rosen Plevneliev and Margarita Popova were elected to the presidency. They were inaugurated on the 22nd of January 2012. Plevneliev did not seek a second term in office and the 2016 election resulted in victory for Rumen Radev and Iliana Yotova. They took the presidential oath on January 19, 2017 and were inaugurated three days later on 22 January. The pair was reelected in 2021.

The salary that the Bulgarian president receives is equal to two monthly salaries of MPs. As of March 2014 this amounted to 4614 Levs.

List of presidents of Bulgaria
Party legend
 (1)
 (1)
 (2)
 (1)

Timeline

See also

 Politics of Bulgaria
 List of Bulgarian monarchs
 List of Bulgarian regents
 List of heads of state of Bulgaria
 List of heads of government of Bulgaria
 List of first deputy chairmen of the State Council of Bulgaria
 Vice President of Bulgaria

References

Bulgaria politics-related lists
Bulgaria